Kazimierz Sakowicz (1899-1944) was a Polish journalist. A witness to the prolonged Ponary massacre, he chronicled much of it in his diary, published in English as Ponary Diary, which became one of the best known testaments to that atrocity of the Second World War, in which about 100 000 Jews, Poles and Russians were murdered by Germans and Lithuanian collaborators. An editor of Przegląd Gospodarczy (Economic Review) journal in Wilno, Sakowicz moved to the Ponary district during the German occupation and chronicled events from July 11, 1941, to October 25, 1943. He was an officer of the pre-war Polish army, and a member of the Polish resistance. On 5 July 1944, while cycling to Wilno, Operation Tempest, he was machine-gunned and seriously wounded. He was found in the evening by his neighbours in a ditch and brought to St. Jacob Hospital in Wilno where he died ten days later. His grave is located in the Rossa Cemetery in Vilnius, among graves of the fallen soldiers of the Polish underground (Armia Krajowa).

References

Further reading 
Blurb of Ponary Diary, 1941-1943: A Bystander's Account of a Mass Murder By Kazimierz Sakowicz, Yitzhak Arad. Yale University Press, 2005
Reading Kazimierz Sakowicz, by Kathryn Cramer

Polish Army officers
1944 deaths
1899 births
20th-century Polish journalists
Deaths by firearm in Lithuania
Burials at Rasos Cemetery
Polish resistance members of World War II
Resistance members killed by Nazi Germany